Karongasaurus (meaning "Karonga District" lizard) is a genus of titanosaur sauropod dinosaur from the Early Cretaceous. The type species, K. gittelmani, was described by Elizabeth Gomani in 2005.

Discovery and naming
The holotype (specimen Mal-175), consisting solely of part of a lower mandible and twenty isolated teeth, were found in the Dinosaur Beds of Malawi between 1987 and 1992. Karongasaurus was the first dinosaur named in a publication that was published solely online; Karongasaurus gittelmani was named and described by Gomani (2005).

Description
The mandible of Karongasaurus is U-shaped in dorsal view and the teeth are described as slender and conical in shape, being more cylindrical than those of Malawisaurus.

Classification
Gomani (2005) placed Karongasaurus within Titanosauria and concluded that it may have been a possible junior synonym of Malawisaurus.

References 

Titanosaurs
Early Cretaceous dinosaurs of Africa
Cretaceous Malawi
Fossils of Malawi
Fossil taxa described in 2005